Carabus lineatus lineatus is a subspecies of beetle from family Carabidae, that is endemic to Spain. They are green coloured.

References

lineatus lineatus
Beetles described in 1826
Endemic fauna of Spain